Leverkusen-Schlebusch station is a through station in the district of Schlebusch of the city of Leverkusen in the German state of North Rhine-Westphalia. It was opened on 25 August 1867 on the Gruiten–Köln-Deutz railway, which was completed between the former Bergisch-Märkische Railway Company (BME) station in Mülheim and Opladen by the BME on 1 May 1868. It has three platform tracks and it is classified by Deutsche Bahn as a category 5 station.

The station is served by the Rhein-Wupper-Bahn (RB 48) between Wuppertal-Oberbarmen and Cologne twice an hour during the day, with one train an hour to/from Bonn-Mehlem.

It is also served by eight bus routes operated by Kraftverkehr Wupper-Sieg: 209 (at 20 minute intervals), 210 (20), 211 (20), 212 (20), 217 (once a day), 222 (20), 226 (4 times a day) and  227 (20).

References

Railway stations in North Rhine-Westphalia
Railway stations in Germany opened in 1867
1867 establishments in Prussia
Buildings and structures in Leverkusen